Jiří Růžička (born 4 June 1941) is a Czech former basketball player. He was voted to the Czechoslovakian 20th Century Team in 2001.

Playing career

Club career
During his club career, Růžička won six Czechoslovakian League championships (1965, 1969, 1970, 1971, 1972, and 1974). He also won the European-wide secondary level FIBA Saporta Cup championship, in the 1968–69 season. He was named to the FIBA European Selection Team in 1967.

National team career
With the senior Czechoslovakian national team, Růžička competed in the men's tournament at the 1972 Summer Olympics. With Czechoslovakia, he also won the silver medal at the 1967 EuroBasket, and the bronze medal at the 1969 EuroBasket.

Coaching career
After his playing career, Růžička worked as a basketball coach. He won the Czech League championship in 1999, with Mlékárna Kunín.

See also
Czechoslovak Basketball League career stats leaders

References

External links
 

1941 births
Living people
Czech men's basketball players
Olympic basketball players of Czechoslovakia
Basketball players at the 1972 Summer Olympics
Place of birth missing (living people)
Czechoslovak men's basketball players
1970 FIBA World Championship players